Björn Jónsson (3 September 1916 – 26 April 1985) was an Icelandic politician and former minister for social affairs from July 1973 to May 1974.

References

External links 
 Non auto-biography of Björn Jónsson on the parliament website

1916 births
1985 deaths
Bjorn Jonsson
Bjorn Jonsson